Bruceiella athlia is a species of sea snail, a marine gastropod mollusk in the family Skeneidae.

Description

Distribution

References

 S. Kiel, Shell structures of selected gastropods from hydrothermal vents and seeps; Malacologia 2004 46 (1) p. 169-183

athlia
Gastropods described in 1993